Ahmad Reza Pourdastan is an Iranian general serving as the head of the Strategic Studies and Research Center of the Islamic Republic of Iran Army. Previously he was the Deputy Commander-in-Chief of the Army of Iran.

References

External links
 If anyone poses threat to Iran, Army immediately knocks them out: Top commander

Living people
Islamic Republic of Iran Army brigadier generals
Place of birth missing (living people)
1956 births
Islamic Republic of Iran Army personnel of the Iran–Iraq War
Commanders of Islamic Republic of Iran Army Ground Force
People from Masjed Soleyman
People from Ahvaz